Bethel Green, also known as the James Bumgardner House, is a historic home located near Greenville, Augusta County, Virginia. The farmhouse was built in 1857, and is a two-story, square brick dwelling with a double-pile, central passage plan, and two-story, rear service ell.  It features a one-story Greek Ionic order portico with fancy scrolled lattice, rear porches with Gothic railings, and bracketed cornices. Also on the property are a contributing bank barn, granary, and shed.

It was listed on the National Register of Historic Places in 1982.

References

Houses on the National Register of Historic Places in Virginia
Houses completed in 1857
Houses in Augusta County, Virginia
National Register of Historic Places in Augusta County, Virginia
1857 establishments in Virginia